Desmacellidae is a family of marine demosponges. It is the only family in the monotypic order Desmacellida.

Genera
The following genera are recognized in the family Desmacellidae:
 Desmacella Schmidt, 1870
 Dragmatella Hallmann, 1917
 Microtylostylifer Dendy, 1924
 Tylosigma Topsent, 1894

References

Heteroscleromorpha
Sponge orders
Taxa named by Arthur Dendy
Taxa named by Stuart Oliver Ridley